Christopher Dwightstone Jones (born July 12, 1990) is a former American football defensive tackle. He was selected in the sixth round of the 2013 NFL draft by the Houston Texans. He played college football for Bowling Green State University. He has also been a member of the Tampa Bay Buccaneers, New England Patriots, Miami Dolphins, New York Jets, and San Francisco 49ers.

College career
Jones played for Bowling Green from 2009 to 2012. In 2009, he had 29 total tackles. The following season, he had 39 tackles and 6.0 sacks. He then had 47 tackles and 8.5 sacks in 2011 and was named to the All-Mid-American Conference (MAC) first-team. In 2012, Jones had 42 tackles, and he ranked third in the nation with 12.5 sacks. He was the MAC defensive player of the year and was named to the All-MAC first-team again.

Professional career

2013 NFL Combine

Houston Texans
Jones was selected by the Houston Texans in the sixth round (198th overall) of the 2013 NFL Draft.

He was released by the Houston Texans on August 31, 2013.

Tampa Bay Buccaneers
Jones was claimed by the Tampa Bay Buccaneers after his release from the Houston Texans on September 1, 2013 and was inactive for the Tampa Bay's season opener against the New York Jets.  He was released by the Buccaneers on September 10, 2013.

New England Patriots

2013
After the Buccaneers waived Jones, the New England Patriots claimed him off waivers. Jones recorded his first career sack against the Cincinnati Bengals on October 6, 2013. On October 20, during overtime of the Patriots' Week 7 game against the New York Jets, Jones was called for a 15-yard unsportsmanlike conduct call on a Nick Folk missed 56-yard field goal that would have given the Patriots the ball around midfield. The call was for violating a rule, altered that season, prohibiting pushing a teammate into the opponent's formation (it was the first time that call had been made). Folk went on to hit a 42-yard field goal that gave the Jets the win, in a game where Jones also recorded two sacks.

Jones finished the season with 6.0 sacks, which was 2nd amongst rookies.

2014
Against the New York Jets, Jones blocked Nick Folk's attempted field goal, securing the victory for the Patriots. The feat also earned him AFC Special Teams Player of the Week honors for Week 7 of the 2014 NFL season.  He finished the season with three sacks and 15 tackles.

2015
Jones and the Patriots won Super Bowl XLIX over the defending champion Seattle Seahawks, Jones allegedly played the game with a torn calf. Jones calf injury caused him to miss the entire 2015 NFL season.

The Patriots waived Jones on April 15, 2016.

Miami Dolphins
On April 18, 2016, Jones was claimed off waivers by the Miami Dolphins. He was released by the Dolphins as part of final roster cuts but re-signed with the team on September 14, 2016.  He played in seven games, starting none, with no sacks and four tackles. He was released by the Dolphins on November 7, 2016.

San Francisco 49ers
Jones was claimed off waivers by the 49ers on November 8, 2016.  He was made starter against the Dolphins on November 27, 2016, and started again the following week.

On March 16, 2017, Jones re-signed with the 49ers. He was placed on injured reserve on September 2, 2017.

New York Jets
On June 5, 2018, Jones signed with the New York Jets. He was released on June 14, 2018.

San Francisco 49ers (second stint)
On August 22, 2018, Jones signed with the San Francisco 49ers. He was released on August 31, 2018.

Personal life 
Jones married his wife Angela on New Year's Day, 2014. The ceremony was held on the 50-yard-line on the field of Gillette Stadium.

References

External links
 New England Patriots bio
 Bowling Green profile
 NFL Draft profile
 NFL 40 yard dash

1990 births
Living people
American football defensive tackles
Bowling Green Falcons football players
People from Brownsburg, Indiana
Players of American football from Indiana
Players of American football from Columbus, Ohio
Houston Texans players
Tampa Bay Buccaneers players
New England Patriots players
Miami Dolphins players
San Francisco 49ers players
New York Jets players